Ken Jernstedt Airfield  is a public airport located two miles (3.2 km) south of the city of Hood River in Hood River County, Oregon, United States.

The fixed-base operator is TacAero, which also bases its tailwheel flight school there. It flies a large fleet of Piper J3 Cubs and Super Cubs and are a big attraction for tourists wanting a scenic flight around the city and Mount Hood.

The airport is named after Kenneth Jernstedt, a former state legislator, mayor of Hood River, and World War II Flying Tigers aviator.

References

External links
History of Ken Jernstedt Airfield
 Western Antique Aeroplane & Automobile Museum

Airports in Hood River County, Oregon
Buildings and structures in Hood River, Oregon